Ellenabad, previously known as Kharial, is a developing city with a municipal committee, near Sirsa City in the Sirsa district of the state of Haryana, India. It is located to the south of the Ghaggar-Hakra River and serves as a port of entry into the state of Haryana from the Rajasthan side.
The Ellenabad city is divided into 17 wards for which elections are held every 5 years. , the city had a population of 36623 in city limits and had a metro population of 44452. Ellenabad Municipal Committee has total administration over 6,810 houses to which it supplies basic amenities like water and sewerage. It is also authorize to build roads within Municipal Committee limits and impose taxes on properties coming under its jurisdiction.

It is a constituency of Haryana Vidhan Sabha. The current MLA is Abhay Singh Chautala.

Etymology 
Ellenabad was founded by Robert Hutch, the Commissioner of Hisar during the British Raj, whose wife gave birth to a child in the area. The story is that Robert Hutch was the Commissioner of Hisar and his wife Madam Ellena was very fond of hunting. Because the land around Kharial was very grassy with many kinds of animals, madam Ellena always went there for hunting. Once she came here with her companions. She was pregnant. While hunting she started suffering from delivery pains. Then her companions took her to Kharial. The people of Kharial served her like their own relative. Madam Ellena got healthy. When she went to Hisar she asked her husband to do something for Kharial's people. Then Mr. Robert Hutch founded a town on the south bank of the Ghaghar river, and named it Ellenabad after the name of his wife.

Transport 
 is well connected by railways on the Sriganganagar-Sadulpur railway line. It is planned to be connected to Sirsa and Sardarshahar by train. Haryana Roadways is the main transport for travelling. Also, there are daily night bus services for Chandigarh, Delhi, Jaipur and Haridwar. Ellenabad also administrates small villages like Mithanpura, Kishanpura, Karamshana, Dhani Sheran under its greater extended urban region.

Demographics 

The Ellenabad Municipal Committee has a population of 36,623 of which 19,441 are males while 17,182 are females, as per a report released by Census India 2011. The population of Children in the range of 0 to 6 years is 4478, which is 12.23% of the total population of Ellenabad (MC). The estimated population for 2020 is between 122,092 and 154,218. In Ellenabad Municipal Committee, the Female Sex Ratio is 884 against the state average of 879. Moreover, the Child Sex Ratio in Ellenabad is around 862 compared to the Haryana state average of 834. The literacy rate of Ellenabad city is 75.19%; lower than the state average of 75.55%. In Ellenabad, Male literacy is 81.80% while the female literacy is 67.75%. The next census evaluation by the Ellenbad Municipal Committee is set to take place in 2021.

Ellenabad has a majority Hindu population, with a significant minority of Sikhs and small Muslim and Christian communities.

Ellenabad Religion Data 2011

Economy
Ellenabad's primary source of income is agriculture. Its grain market provides support to farmers from surrounding villages and daily trains connect Ellenabad to Mumbai, Jaipur, and Sri Ganganagar.

Education 
Sarvpalli Public School, Nachiketan Public School Sarvodaya Shiksha Sadan , Nachiketan Model school  are the quality education institute.  The other most notable schools in the city are Satluj Public School, Sir Chhotu Ram Jat Senior Secondary School, Nivedita , Sarvpalli Public School, Ch. Harpal Singh Convent School (H.C.S.), Satluj Public School. These are well known for their English and Mathematics departments.

Health care
Nearby hospitals include the Civil Hospital, Janta Hospital, Gupta nursing and maternity home, Jain Hospital, Shri Nursing Home, CMC Hospital, Bansal Hospital, Pareek Hospital, Singla Hospital, Shubham Hospital, a pediatric hospital, Chaudhary jholachaapHospital, City Eye Jholachaap hospital and many others.

References

External links
 Ellenabad News
 All Information About Ellenabad City Site
 Village Mojukhera

 Ellenabad Mandi Bhav

Cities and towns in Sirsa district